Meneghini is an Italian surname. Notable people with the surname include:

Elisa Meneghini (born 1997), Italian artistic gymnast
Francisco Meneghini (born 1988), Argentine football manager
Giuseppe Giovanni Antonio Meneghini (1811–1889), Italian botanist, geologist, and paleontologist

Italian-language surnames